Batala is a municipal corporation in Gurdaspur district in the state of Punjab, India.

Batala may also refer to:
 Batala Assembly Constituency in Punjab, India
 Batala Colony, an area in southern Faisalabad, Pakistan
 Batala (music), an international music group

See also 
 Battala, an area of Serampore, West Bengal, India
 Bathala, a Philippine deity
 Bathala (island), an island of the Maldives
 Batalha (disambiguation)
 Batalla, a surname (including a list of persons with the name)